Leo Sanford (born October 4, 1929) is a former professional football player for the Chicago Cardinals and the Baltimore Colts.

References

1929 births
Living people
American football linebackers
Baltimore Colts players
Chicago Cardinals players
Louisiana Tech Bulldogs football players
Eastern Conference Pro Bowl players
Players of American football from Shreveport, Louisiana
Players of American football from Dallas